Father David O'Hanlon (born 1969) is an Irish Roman Catholic priest and theologian. His attacks on the President of Ireland, members of the Irish hierarchy and fellow priests, and the Irish news media earned him notoriety. His critique of liberalism, drawing on some of the philosophical presuppositions of writers such Alasdair MacIntyre and Roger Scruton, has received praise and criticism in Ireland.

Early life
O'Hanlon was born in 1969 at Boyerstown, a village and townland near Navan, County Meath. He received his early education at the Boyerstown National School and at St. Patrick's Classical School in Navan.

He entered St. Patrick's College, Maynooth, as a clerical student for the diocese of Meath in 1987. He gained a double first class honours in Greek and Latin for his Bachelor of Arts degree.

Transferred to the Pontifical Irish College, Rome, he obtained a first class degree in theology at the Gregorian University in 1993, and a Licentiate of Sacred Theology, with specialization in Patristics from the Augustinianum in 1997. His thesis was entitled The Symbolum Antiochenum of 433: The Self Defeating Culmination of a Christological Novelty, and attracted much academic praise for its ground-breaking work.

Ordained to the priesthood in 1995, O'Hanlon was appointed curate in the County Meath parish of Kentstown, near Navan. In 2007, he began research for a Doctorate in Sacred Theology in Rome.

Fr. O'Hanlon is currently the curate in the parish of Summerhill, County Meath.

Denouncing another priest
O'Hanlon rose to public prominence in the 1990s due to a controversial interview he gave to Gay Byrne on RTÉ's The Late Late Show in which he disagreed strongly with members of the studio audience and a fellow Catholic priest, Iggy O'Donovan, who was on the panel. During the discussion (which the presenter extended, postponing other parts of the show, such was the ferocity of the debate), O'Hanlon controversially denounced another priest mentioned by a member of the audience as a "charlatan", a "fraud" and a "hypocrite".

Mary Robison's visit to the Vatican
O'Hanlon caused controversy when in an Irish Times article in 1997 he attacked Irish President Mary Robinson for her behaviour and attire during a visit to the Vatican. He accused Mary Robinson of:
 dressing inappropriately for a visit to Pope John Paul II by not wearing black and not wearing a mantilla; O'Hanlon described Robinson's attire as  "bedizened in Kelly green, showy jewellery and—to boot—a sprig of vegetation".
 showing the Pope disrespect by not paying a state visit to him earlier in her term of office;
 breaking Vatican protocol by visiting the Vatican while on a state visit to Italy;
 breaking Vatican protocol by not being accompanied by her chaplain and by not visiting the tomb of Saint Peter.

O'Hanlon alleged that Robinson wanted to get herself turned away from the Vatican for being "improperly dressed". He even claimed there was precedent for a high-ranking woman visitor to the Pope being turned away for being improperly dressed, citing Paola of Belgium in the early 1960s.

Most of O'Hanlon's claims have been disputed by the Vatican and the Catholic bishops of Ireland:
 Vatican dress codes for both men and women were relaxed early in Pope John Paul II's pontificate. While most female royalty voluntarily abide by the traditional dress code (black dress, mantilla) most female republican heads of state or First Ladies do not. Raisa Gorbachova wore red. Robinson's dark green outfit had been judged perfectly acceptable by the Vatican, whereas earlier presidents of Ireland, notably Éamon de Valera in the 1960s (see image), were required by Vatican protocol to wear white tie and decorations (honours), the male equivalent of the traditional black dress and manilla. Robinson's immediate predecessor, Patrick Hillery, was also allowed to wear less formal attire. In his case, Hillery wore a lounge suit for his April 1989 visit. When Taoiseach Bertie Ahern wore the traditional white tie to the ceremony raising the Archbishop of Dublin to the cardinate, he found himself to be only guest wearing it. All the other official guests without exception had worn lounge suits. According to The Examiner when Robinson's successor, Mary McAleese visited the Pope "the Vatican had earlier told the President's advisers that a traditional lace mantilla was not a requirement."
 State visits are only made by invitation. Robinson's visit was a "private" visit. Robinson was not invited to pay a state visit during her term because the last state visit by an Irish president had occurred in April 1989, one year before her term started; the next invitation to an Irish president to pay a state visit was not due for a decade, meaning that whoever was elected in the 1990 presidential election would not be receiving an invitation to pay a state visit to the Holy See.
 Presidents only are accompanied by their chaplain and visit the tomb of Saint Peter on state visits, not private visits.
 World leaders regularly pay personal visits to meet the Pope while on state visits to Italy, contrary to O'Hanlon's claims.
 Princess Paola of Belgium was never turned away from an audience with Pope John XXIII. While on a private trip to Rome as a tourist whose identity was unknown she went to St. Peter's Basilica. An attendant declined her admittance because her arms were uncovered. Vatican protocol did not allow women with uncovered arms to enter the basilica. Neither the attendant nor the Vatican knew at the time that the tourist was a member of the Belgian Royal Family (and future queen). When the Pope discovered what had happened he apologised and invited her to an audience.

That it was a personal visit and not a state visit was shown in two ways:
 the papal dress on the day: on state visits popes wear a form of choral dress (red mozzetta) with stole. Pope John Paul II wore a standard white cassock during his meeting with President Robinson, indicating that the meeting was not at state visit level;
 the awarding of a papal order to the visiting head of state. President de Valera, for example, was one of the last heads of state to be awarded the Order of Christ, by Pope John XXIII, while President Seán T. O'Kelly was awarded the Pian Order (3rd Class) by Pope Pius XII. Papal awards during state visits are automatic, with details negotiated between the governments of the state whose head of state is visiting and the government of the Holy See. No award was offered to President Robinson, nor was one expected.

The distinction between the two types of papal visit, state and non-state, is shown in the language used in describing such visits. The Catholic Press Office in Dublin, in listing papal engagements, describes state visits in the format State visit of French President Jacques Chirac (20 January 1996). In contrast non-state visits are variously described as audiences, someone being received by the Pope, or simply a visit. For example, Pope receives Lien Chan, vice president and prime minister of the Republic of China (14 January 1997), Visit by Israeli Prime Minister Benjamin Netanyahu (3 February 1997), Pope receives King Albert II and Queen Paola of the Belgians (15 May 1998). Robinson's visit on 10 May 1997 was described with the words Ireland's President Mary Robinson received by [the] Holy Father, clearly indicating it was simply an informal visit, in which she was visiting, and so being received by, Pope John Paul, not a formal state visit surrounded by all the ritual associated; visits to Peter's tomb, a large formal delegation, formal dress (black or otherwise), swapping of honours, state banquets, etc.

Bishops disown comments
O'Hanlon's comments were quickly disowned by leaders of the Catholic Church. The Vatican rejected his claim that a breach of protocol had occurred, expressing puzzlement at the allegations and saying that the visit had been a complete success. Bishop Willie Walsh of Killaloe wrote
dismay, embarrassment, outrage are the reactions. We are simply appalled that a fellow priest would refer to our president – or indeed to any person – as being 'cheap'.

O'Hanlon's bishop, Michael Smith, disassociated himself, his diocese and its priests from the comments. O'Hanlon's uncle, a Catholic priest, wrote the Irish newspapers to disown his nephew's comments.

Bishop John Kirby expressed "shock" and ten priests along with Kirby from the Irish charity Trócaire wrote to the Irish Times to disassociate themselves from O'Hanlon's comments. The Catholic Press Office in Dublin stated that the President's dress had been of "no concern" while press spokesman Jim Cantwell dismissed claims that the Pope was offended as "a bit ridiculous". The President's chaplain, Maynooth College lecturer Father Enda McDonagh, categorised the attack as "partly begrudgery and partly mistaken piety."

O'Hanlon replied in the Irish Times with a series of attacks on his critics. He wrote
Sadly, I am not acquainted with any of the [individuals who signed the letter]. . . . Old priests tell me they were once the up-and-coming generation. Does it threaten them that somebody like myself, a neophyte of 28, now rejects their complacent, characterless, and crumbling compromise between Church and modern Ireland? . . . We call a person cheap not because they look cheap but because their actions are cheap. I call the President of Ireland cheap because her behaviour in Rome towards her host, the Bishop of Rome, was a cheap travesty of respect and a cheap personal propaganda stunt from start to finish.

He explained his belief as to why the President of Ireland would supposedly have wanted to have been thrown out of a papal audience:

This ... might then be represented to the Irish people as the ultimate bang of a crosier for all that post-Catholic Ireland has become, and the last gasp of a desperate, discredited, rigid, reactionary, and patriarchal regime. . . . Mary wanted John Paul to give her a black eye; his Holiness serenely turned her a blind (albeit 'twinkling') one. She wanted to cut a provocative, modern, dashing figure. He left her looking like a crank. . . . What President Robinson represented in reality at the Vatican was nothing other than her own personal animosity towards Catholicism as interpreted by Pope John Paul II – a clear case of very cross dressing!

Fr. Austin Flannery, a senior Irish priest and theologian who had been a compiler of documents in Vatican II (and who had been dismissed by O'Hanlon as a "has been"), criticised O'Hanlon's remarks as "ill-informed and very offensive".

Newspaper columnist Medb Ruane, referring to comments by O'Hanlon about women, suggested that the motivation for his attacks on Mary Robinson and the reasons for her supposed offence were clear:

The real question is not so much whether she did or did not deliberately flout convention, but rather that she is. She is." She believed his comments "hint at an attitude to women that may inform his feelings about the president."

O'Hanlon's comments dominated both the print and broadcast media for up to one month. He refused pressure from the Catholic Church to withdraw his allegations and to apologise.

Funding of anti-abortion campaign
O'Hanlon was revealed to be one of those who funded the political campaigns Family Values and anti-abortion campaigner Dana Rosemary Scallon, with a number of donations of €1000. during one of Ireland's abortion referendums. Her campaign ensured sufficient conservatives voted against an altering of the abortion law, which prevented the introduction of embryonic stem cell research. O'Hanlon was one of a group of Catholic priests to publicly support Dana's stance.

Criticizing priests as "defeatist"
In 2006 O'Hanlon again made headlines when he criticized his fellow priests as being "defeatist". He wrote in The Irish Catholic that "From the results of 'The Irish Catholic' survey we seem rather at odds with the teachings of our own Church, above all concerning the very nature of the priesthood itself, but quite consistently in tune with popular opinion on subjects like feminism and ecumenism ... I am struck by the passivity, almost defeatism of the responses: we can't wait to cut Masses and resign school management. We demand an end to priestly celibacy yet admit getting rid of it would have no noticeable effect on the future of the institution."

Footnotes

Sources
 The Irish Times
 Catholic World News
 Sunday Independent
 The Irish Catholic
 Raidió Teilifís Éireann
 Vatican Press Office

External links
 RTÉ Radio One interview with O'Hanlon

1969 births
20th-century Irish Roman Catholic priests
Living people
Alumni of St Patrick's College, Maynooth
Pontifical Irish College alumni
Pontifical Gregorian University alumni
Alumni of The Irish College, Rome
21st-century Irish Roman Catholic priests